Hibernatus is a 1969 French-Italian comedy directed by Édouard Molinaro and written by Jean Bernard-Luc. It stars Louis de Funès as an industrialist named Hubert Barrère de Tartas.

Plot
A man frozen for 65 years is found in the ice of the North Pole by a scientific polar expedition. While he is brought back to life by professor Edouard Lauriebat (Michael Lonsdale), the man is identified as Paul Fournier, who was exploring the pole in 1905 and is now, thanks to hibernation, a ninety-year-old young man. Edmée de Tartas (Claude Gensac), born Fournier, is identified as the granddaughter of Paul and convinces her husband, Hubert Barrère de Tartas (Louis de Funès), that Paul must be given back to his family, while the government wishes to treat Paul as a research subject. After a kidnapping and a pursuit, the authorities reluctantly agree, but impose, for the sake of Paul's mental health, that his environment be the same as in 1905. As Paul thinks Edmée is his mother, Hubert must play the role of a man courting Edmée and Didier (Olivier de Funès), the son of Edmée and Hubert plays the role of a student living with the family. First under control, the situation gradually deteriorates especially when Paul's actions become a threat to Hubert's plan to marry his son to the daughter of Crepin-Jaujard, one of his business partners.

Cast 
 Louis de Funès as Hubert Barrère de Tartas, important industrial
 Claude Gensac as Edmée de Tartas, wife of Hubert
 Bernard Alane as Paul Fournier (« Hibernatus »), grandfather of Edmée
 Olivier de Funès as Didier de Tartas
 Michel Lonsdale as professor Edouard Lauriebat
 Pascal Mazzotti as professor Bibolini, psychiatre
 Martine Kelly as Sophie
 Paul Préboist as Charles
 Annick Alane as Mme Crépin-Jaujard
 Yves Vincent as M. Edouard Crépin-Jaujard

References

External links
 
 

1969 comedy films 
1969 films
1960s science fiction comedy films
French comedy films
Italian comedy films
1960s French-language films
Films directed by Édouard Molinaro
Films scored by Georges Delerue
Cryonics in fiction
Fictional cryonically preserved characters
1960s Italian films
1960s French films